Thomas Brewster is a fictional character played by John Pickard in a series of audio plays produced by Big Finish Productions based on the long-running British science fiction television series Doctor Who. An orphan and street urchin from 19th-century London, he is a companion of the Fifth and Sixth Doctors.

Character history
The character first appears in The Haunting of Thomas Brewster, where he met the Fifth Doctor and Nyssa on 1867 while he was being haunted by what he thought was the ghost of his mother, who had died in 1851. It turned out that he was under the control of an alien pretending to be his mother. After the Doctor helped him, he stowed away in the Doctor's TARDIS and accidentally set it on a solo flight.

Brewster gained limited control over the TARDIS. On one of his stops, the TARDIS was taken from him for ransom and he was forced to work for Gerry Lenz, who had met the Doctor in previous incarnations. At this time, Brewster met the Doctor's old friends, Brigadier Lethbridge-Stewart and Polly Wright. The three of them rescued the TARDIS from Lenz and saved the Earth from dying and from a Coffinloader, a beast which fed on dying worlds.

Eventually, the TARDIS began to malfunction due to Brewster's meddling. Before the ship could come to any further harm, Brewster was helped by an elderly Adric (who was unintentionally saved from his apparent death in Earthshock by Block Transfer Computations subconsciously sent to him by the Doctor while trying to recover the stolen TARDIS, that caused Adric to be sent into a pocket dimension based on an Aztec jungle), who got him back to London a few months after his departure. Afterwards, the Doctor invited him to join him on his travels.

Soon after he joined, they returned to the location of one of his previous travels, where it was revealed that Brewster had sold several vital components of the TARDIS to the marooned crew of the Gamma. Among the components Brewster sold was the TARDIS' conceptual geometer, the removal of which greatly destabilised the structure of the TARDIS and eventually caused the collapse of the ship's internal dimensions. However, the Doctor was able to reconnect the geometer to the TARDIS, restoring its interior to normal.

Brewster later convinced the Doctor to take him to 2008 supposedly to see his future. In fact, he wished to be reunited with a young woman named Connie Winter, whom he had met whilst travelling in the Doctor's TARDIS alone. Thomas decided to stay in 2008 with Connie rather than continue travelling with the Doctor and Nyssa, the Doctor giving him the deed to his house on Baker Street.

Brewster enjoyed his life with Connie, but tragedy struck: She was hit by a car and suffered an irreversible coma. Feeling alone in a time where he didn't fit, Brewster found the time machine he had built while under the control of the alien pretending to be his mother in 1867. He was trying to return to his own time when he was contacted by Symbios, a sentient planet which was being invaded by an alien robot species called the Terravore. Brewster provided Symbios with hosts who were riding the London Underground. After defeating the Terravores with the Doctor, now in his sixth incarnation, Evelyn Smythe and DI Patricia Menzies, Brewster stole the TARDIS key, snuck aboard and demanded the Doctor and Evelyn that they return him to his own time. After some convincing from Evelyn, who genuinely wanted to help him, the Doctor acquiesced.

After an adventure in Victorian Lancashire, Brewster was left behind by the Doctor. However, he went on to travel with an alien trader in an interstellar company.

Although Brewster doesn't appear directly, he plays an indirect role in the Eighth Doctor audio series Stranded; when circumstances force the Doctor and his current companions to take up full-time residence in London after the TARDIS is seriously damaged, Brewster had converted the Baker Street house into flats, forcing the Doctor to live in the attic and simply act as the property's landlord.

List of appearances

Audio dramas

with the Fifth Doctor
The Haunting of Thomas Brewster
The Boy That Time Forgot
Time Reef
A Perfect World

with the Sixth Doctor
The Crimes of Thomas Brewster
The Feast of Axos
Industrial Evolution

External links

Literary characters introduced in 2008
Doctor Who audio characters
Doctor Who spin-off companions
Fictional people from the 19th-century
Male characters in literature
Fictional people from London
Orphan characters in literature